is a Japanese actor. He won the Blue Ribbon Award for Best Actor in 1984 for The Funeral and Farewell to the Ark. Yamazaki is well known for his role "Nenbutsu no Tetsu" on the television jidaigeki Hissatsu Shiokinin and Shin Hissatsu Shiokinin.

Career
Yamazaki graduated from Haiyuza Theatre Company and joined Bungakuza in 1959. He made his film debut in Kihachi Okamoto`s Daigaku no sanzôkutachi in 1960. In 1961, he received the Elan d'or Award for Newcomer of the Year. In 1963, he appeared in Akira Kurosawa's High and Low. He worked with Kurosawa twice more: in the director's next film, 1965's Red Beard, then fifteen years later, in Kagemusha.

In 1973, he appeared jidaigeki television drama Hissatsu Shiokinin and he played the same role in Shin Hissatsu Shiokinin again in 1977. He also starred in director Juzo Itami movies, as a trucker who resembles John Wayne in Tampopo (1985) as well as co-starring in The Ramen Girl (2008) with Brittany Murphy.

He also played a supporting role in Yōjirō Takita's Departures.

Filmography

Film

TV dramas

Awards and honours

References

External links
 
 

1936 births
20th-century Japanese male actors
21st-century Japanese male actors
Living people
People from Matsudo
Recipients of the Medal with Purple Ribbon
Recipients of the Order of the Rising Sun, 4th class